Angel of the Morning, released in 1981, is the debut album of Norwegian singer Elisabeth Andreassen, and the first of several solo albums. Previously, she sang with Mats Rådberg on his album I'm the Singer, You're the Song (1980). Angel of the Morning contains songs in both Swedish and English, including "Angel of the Morning", which Andreassen released in the early 1980s, and the hit "Då lyser en sol". The album reached approximately 20,000 sales in Sweden, equivalent to selling gold in Norway. It peaked at #46 at the Swedish album chart.

Track listing

Side A

Side B

Chart positions

References

1981 debut albums
Elisabeth Andreassen albums